Dan Ion Potocianu (born 5 March 1974) is a Romanian former footballer who played as a defender during the 1990s and early 2000s.

Career
Potocianu started playing professionally in 1990 with his home-town team FCM Reșița. In 1993, he earned a move to FC Progresul București where he went on to make over 100 appearances before leaving for Switzerland's Servette FC in 1997. While at Servette, he had a loan spell.

Potocianu joined FC Basel's first team on loan during the second half of their 1998–99 season under head coach Guy Mathez. Potocianu played his domestic league debut for the club in the away game in the Charmilles Stadium on 13 March 1999 as Basel were defeated 1–2 by Servette. During his short loan period with the club, Potocianu played a total of 12 games for Basel without scoring a goal. 10 of these games were in the Nationalliga A and two were friendly games.

He returned to Progresul București in 2000, but injury forced him to retire in 2002 at the age of 28.

He was capped once for the Romania national team, as a second-half substitute for Anton Doboş in an 8-1 European Championships Qualifying win over Liechtenstein in Eschen on 6 September 1997.

Honours
CSM Reșița
Divizia B (1): 1991–92

Naţional București
Divizia A Runner-up (3): 1995–96, 1996–97, 2001–02
Romanian Cup Runner-up (1): 1996–97

Servette
Swiss League (1): 1998–99

References

Sources
 Rotblau: Jahrbuch Saison 2017/2018. Publisher: FC Basel Marketing AG. 
 Die ersten 125 Jahre. Publisher: Josef Zindel im Friedrich Reinhardt Verlag, Basel. 
 Verein "Basler Fussballarchiv" Homepage

External links
 
 
 

1974 births
Living people
Sportspeople from Reșița
Romanian footballers
Romanian expatriate footballers
Romania international footballers
CSM Reșița players
FC Progresul București players
Servette FC players
FC Basel players
Swiss Super League players
Expatriate footballers in Switzerland
Romanian expatriate sportspeople in Switzerland
Liga I players
Liga II players
CSM Reșița managers
Association football defenders
Romanian football managers